János Pintz (born 20 December 1950 in Budapest) is a Hungarian mathematician working in analytic number theory. He is a fellow of the Rényi Mathematical Institute and is also a member of the Hungarian Academy of Sciences. In 2014, he received the Cole Prize.

Mathematical results
Pintz is best known for proving in 2005 (with Daniel Goldston and Cem Yıldırım) that
 
where  denotes the nth prime number. In other words, for every ε > 0, there exist infinitely many pairs of consecutive primes pn and pn+1 that are closer to each other than the average distance  between consecutive primes by a factor of ε, i.e., pn+1 − pn < ε log pn. This result was originally reported in 2003 by Daniel Goldston and Cem Yıldırım but was later retracted. Pintz joined the team and completed the proof in 2005. Later they improved this to showing that pn+1 − pn < ε(log log n)2 occurs infinitely often. Further, if one assumes the Elliott–Halberstam conjecture, then one can also show that primes within 16 of each other occur infinitely often, which is nearly the twin prime conjecture.

Additionally,
 With János Komlós and Endre Szemerédi he disproved the Heilbronn conjecture.
 With Iwaniec he proved that for sufficiently large n  there is a prime between n and n + n23/42.
 Pintz gave an effective upper bound for the first number for which the Mertens conjecture fails.
 He gave an O(x2/3) upper bound for the number of those numbers that are less than x and not the sum of two primes.
 With Imre Z. Ruzsa he improved a result of Linnik by showing that every sufficiently large even number is the sum of two primes and at most 8 powers of 2.
 Goldston, S. W. Graham, Pintz, and Yıldırım proved that the difference between numbers which are products of exactly 2 primes is infinitely often at most 6.

See also
Prime gap
Landau's problems
Fazekas Mihály Gimnázium
Maier's theorem

References

External links
János Pintz's page at the Alfréd Rényi Institute of Mathematics

Number theorists
Institute for Advanced Study visiting scholars
Members of the Hungarian Academy of Sciences
Eötvös Loránd University alumni
Mathematicians from Budapest
20th-century Hungarian mathematicians
21st-century Hungarian mathematicians
Living people
1950 births